Substrata may refer to:
Substrata (linguistics), plural of substratum, a language influenced by another
Substrata (gardening), another term for subsoil
Substrata (album), an ambient music album by Biosphere
Earth's substrata, the geologic layering of the Earth
Substrata 2, 2001 album by Biosphere

See also
Substratum in Vedic Sanskrit
Stratum (disambiguation)
Strata (disambiguation)
Substrate (disambiguation)